Notable people (and fictional characters) surnamed Landers include:

Arts and media
 Alan Landers (1940–2009), American actor
 Ann Landers, pen name of several advice columnists in the Chicago Sun-Times
 Audrey Landers (born 1956), American actress and singer
 Harry Landers (1921-2017), American character actor
 Judy Landers (born 1958), American film and television actress
 Karen Baker Landers, sound editor (also known as Karen M. Baker)
 Katie Landers, a fictional character from the Australian TV soap opera Neighbours
 Lew Landers (1901–1962), American film producer
 Muriel Landers (1921–1977), American actress, singer and dancer
 Paul Landers (born 1964), German musician
 Sean Landers (born 1962), American artist
 Tim Landers (born 1956), American  musician, composer and record producer
 Todd Landers, a fictional character from the Australian TV soap opera Neighbours
 Veronica Landers, a fictional character from the US TV soap opera The Young and the Restless

Politics
 David C. Landers (1801–1890), Liberal MLA in Nova Scotia
 Franklin Landers (1825–1901) was a U.S. Representative from Indiana
 George M. Landers (1813–1895), U.S. Representative from Connecticut
 Mike Landers (politician) (born 1943), a member of the Canadian House of Commons
 Patrick Landers (born 1959), Representative in the Massachusetts House, later senior VP of Lehman Brothers
 William R. Landers, member of the Mississippi House of Representatives

Sport
 Andy Landers (born 1952), head coach at the University of Georgia
 Bob Landers, Australian rugby league footballer
 Cathy Landers (born 1960), former camogie player
 John Joe Landers (1907–2001), Gaelic footballer
 Mark Landers (born 1972), hurling coach and former player
 Robert Landers (born 1944), American golfer
 Rodney Landers (born 1986), American football player
 Sherman Landers (1898–1994), American track
 Walt Landers, American football player
 Willi Landers, East German canoeist (active in 1960s)

Other
 John Maxwell Landers (born 1952), Principal of Hertford College, Oxford

See also
 Lander (surname)